The El Gouna Film Festival (GFF) is an annual film festival established in 2017, held in the Red Sea resort town of El Gouna, Egypt. The inaugural festival started September 22, 2017. The psychological thriller Scary Mother, by Georgian first-time director Ana Urushadze, took the Golden Star, the festival's top feature film competition prize. Oscar-winning actor-director Forest Whitaker was feted with a lifetime achievement award.

Awards

Feature Narrative Competition 
 El Gouna Gold Star for a Narrative Film

(Trophy, Certificate and USD 50,000)

 El Gouna Silver Star for Narrative Film

(Trophy, Certificate and USD 25,000)

 El Gouna Bronze Star Narrative Film

(Certificate, Trophy and USD 15,000)

 El Gouna Star for Best Arab Narrative Film

(Trophy, Certificate and USD 20,000)

 El Gouna Star for Best Actor

(Trophy and Certificate)

 El Gouna Star for Best Actress

(Trophy and Certificate)

Feature Documentary Competition 

 El Gouna Gold Star for a Documentary Film

(Trophy, Certificate and USD 30,000)

 El Gouna Silver Star for Documentary Film

(Trophy, Certificate and USD 15,000)

 El Gouna Bronze Star Documentary Film

(Trophy, Certificate and USD 7,500)

 El Gouna Star for Best Arab Documentary Film

(Trophy, Certificate and USD 10,000)

2017 Winners

Feature Narrative competition 
Golden Star: Scary Mother, Ana Urushadze

Silver Star: The Insult, Ziad Dower

Bronze Star: Arrhythmia, Boris Khlebnikov

Golden Star for Best Arabic Feature Film: Photocopy, Tamer Ashry

Best Actress: Nadia Kounda, Volubilis

Best Actor: Daniel Gimenez Cacho, Zama

Cinema For Humanity Audience Award: Soufra, Thomas Morgan

Documentary competition 
Golden Star: I Am Not Your Negro, Raoul Peck

Silver Star: Brimstone and Glory, Viktor Jakovleski

Bronze Star: Mrs Fang, Wang Bing

Golden Star For Best Arabic Documentary: I Have a Picture, Mohamed Zedan

Short Film competition 
Golden Star: Nightshade, Shady El-Hamus

Silver Star: Merry-Go-Round, Ruslan Bratov

Bronze Star: Mama Bobo, Robin Andelfinger and Ibrahima Seydi

El Gouna Star for Best Arab Short Film: Punchline, Christophe M. Saber

2018 Winners

Feature Narrative competition 
Golden Star: A Land Imagined, Yeo Siew Hua

Silver Star: Ray & Liz, Richard Billingham

Bronze Star: The Heiresses, Marcelo Martinessi

El Gouna Star for Best Arabic Narrative Film: Yomeddine, A.B. Shawky

Special Mention: The Man Who Surprised Everyone, Natasha Merkulova and Aleksey Chupov

Best Actress: Joanna Kulig, Cold War

Best Actor: Mohamed Dhrif, Dear Son

Cinema for Humanity Audience Award: Another Day Of Life; Raúl De La Fuente, Damian Nenow and Yomeddine, A.B. Shawky (joint winners)

Feature Documentary competition 
Golden Star: Aquarela, Victor Kossakovsky

Silver Star: Of Fathers and Sons, Talal Derki

Bronze Star: The Swing, Cyril Aris

El Gouna Star for Best Arab Documentary Film: Of Fathers and Sons, Talal Derki

Short Film competition 
Golden Star: Our Song To War, Juanita Onzaga

Silver Star: Judgement, Raymund Ribay Gutierrez

Bronze Star: Sheikh's Watermelons, Kaouther Ben Hania

El Gouna Star for Best Arab Short Film: EyeBrows, Tamer Ashry

2019 Winners

Feature Narrative competition 
Golden Star: You Will Die at Twenty, Amjad Abu Alala

Silver Star: Corpus Christi, Jan Komasa

Bronze Star: Adam, Maryam Touzani

El Gouna Star for Best Arabic Narrative Film: Papicha, Mounia Meddour

Best Actress: Hend Sabry, Noura's Dream

Best Actor: Bartosz Bielenia, Corpus Christi

Cinema for Humanity Audience Award: Les Misérables, Ladj Ly

FIPRESCI Award: 1982, Oualid Mouaness

Feature Documentary competition 
Golden Star: Talking About Trees, Suhaib Gasmelbari

Silver Star: 143 Sahara Street, Hassen Ferhani

Bronze Star: Kabul, City in the Wind, Aboozar Amini

El Gouna Star for Best Arab Documentary Film: Ibrahim: A Fate to Define, Lina Alabed

NETPAC Award for Best Asian Film: Kabul, City in the Wind, Aboozar Amini

Short Film competition 
Golden Star: Exam, Sonia K. Haddad

Silver Star: Ome, Wassim Geagea

Bronze Star: Flesh, Camila Kater

El Gouna Star for Best Arab Short Film: Give Up the Ghost, Zain Duraie

Special Jury Mention: 16 December, Álvaro Gago Díaz

2021 Winners

Feature Narrative competition 
Golden Star: The Blind Man Who Did Not Want to See Titanic, Teemu Nikki

Silver Star: Sun Down, Michel Franco

Bronze Star: Captain Volkongov Escaped, Aleksey Chupov, Natasha Merkulova

El Gouna Star for Best Arabic Narrative Film: Feathers, Omar El Zohairy

Best Actress: Petri Poikolainen, Playground

Best Actor: Perri Poikonainen, The Blind Man Who Did Not Want to See Titanic

Cinema for Humanity Audience Award: Ostrove: Lost Island, Svetlana Rodina, Laurent Stoop

FIPRESCI Award: Costa Brava, Mounia Akl

Feature Documentary competition 
Golden Star: Life of Ivana, Renato Borrayo Serrano

Silver Star: Ostrov - Lost Island, Svetlana Rodina, Laurent Stoop

Bronze Star: Sabaya, Hogir Hirori

El Gouna Star for Best Arab Documentary Film: Captains of Za’atari, Ali El Arabi

NETPAC Award for Best Asian Film: Captain Volkongov Escaped, Aleksey Chupov, Natasha Merkulova

Short Film competition 
Golden Star: Katia, Andrey Natotcinskiy

Silver Star: Holy Son, Aliosha Massine

Bronze Star: On Solid Ground, Jela Hasler

El Gouna Star for Best Arab Short Film: Cai-Ber, Ahmed Abdelsalam

Special Mention: actress Aisha Al Rifae for Nour Shams directed by Faiza Ambah

Side events
Pitching Session: CinemaTech by Gemini Africa     

Gemini Africa is an EgyptIan company extending into Africa and the Middle East for tech startups in an entrepreneurial pitching event under Cinematech’s track.

CinemaTech is the first entrepreneurial track bridging the gap between entrepreneurship and filmmaking, with the aim of uplifting the industry by injecting technological solutions offered by startups.

References

External links
 official website

Film festivals in Egypt
2017 establishments in Egypt
Film festivals established in 2017